Canistrum triangulare is a plant species in the genus Canistrum. This species is endemic to Brazil.

Cultivars
 Canistrum 'Black Sands'
 Canistrum 'Flare'
 × Canmea 'Tropic Beauty'
 × Canmea 'Wild Leopard'
 × Canmea 'Wild Tiger'

References

BSI Cultivar Registry Retrieved 11 October 2009

triangulare
Flora of Brazil